is a passenger railway station located in the town of Kumenan, Kume District, Okayama Prefecture, Japan, operated by West Japan Railway Company (JR West).

Lines

Station layout
The station consists of one ground-level side platform serving a single bi-directional track. The wooden station building dates to the foundation of the station in 1898. The station is unattended.

Adjacent stations

History
Tanjōji Station opened on December 21, 1898.  With the privatization of the Japan National Railways (JNR) on April 1, 1987, the station came under the aegis of the West Japan Railway Company.

Passenger statistics
In fiscal 2019, the station was used by an average of 47 passengers daily..

Surrounding area
 Tanjō-ji Temple
 Okayama Prefectural Tanjoji Support School
 Japan National Route 53.

See also
List of railway stations in Japan

References

External links

 Tanjōji Station Official Site

Railway stations in Okayama Prefecture
Tsuyama Line
Railway stations in Japan opened in 1898
Kumenan, Okayama